The old Berlin Nordbahnhof was a short-lived passenger railway terminus in Berlin, Germany. It was situated in Prenzlauer Berg, close to the borders with Gesundbrunnen, in the area of the "Mauerpark".

Geography
The station was located at the junction point of Eberswalder Straße with Bernauer Straße, close to the "Friedrich-Ludwig-Jahn-Sportpark". The sportpark's tramway stop (line M10) serves the area.

History

Berlin Nordbahnhof opened on 10 July 1877 as the southern terminus of the Berlin Northern Railway Berlin-Stralsund. The passenger traffic was handled by the nearby Stettiner Bahnhof, located at the western end at Bernauer Straße. The Nordbahnhof was a freight yard only except for the years from 1892 to 1898 when a part of local traffic started from Nordbahnhof instead of Stettiner Bahnhof during construction works there.

In 1950 the Stettiner Bahnhof took the name Nordbahnhof because the city of Stettin went to Poland and GDR government did not want to use German names for Polish cities. The old Nordbahnhof was renamed to Güterbahnhof (freight yard) Eberswalder Straße. After the building of the Berlin Wall, in 1961, only a small part of local freight traffic remained. It was finally closed in 1985. After 2000 a large fraction of the area became part of the Mauerpark.

Nowadays the ground where the station's tracks were located is the seat of the Mauerpark, a commemorative park about the Berlin Wall on the former "death strip" nearby Bernauer Straße. Some years before the renewal of Gesundbrunnen station (2006) it was possible to see some remains of the tracks, now removed, from the Ringbahn, between Gesundbrunnen and Schönhauser Allee station.

See also
Berlin Nordbahnhof

Notes and references

External links
 The Old Nordbahnhof on Mauerpark website
Locator map of the Old Nordbahnhof (on de.wp)
The Berlin Wall's death strip on the former track ground of the Nordbahnhof

Buildings and structures in Pankow
Nordbahnhof Old
Former buildings and structures in Germany
Railway stations in Germany opened in 1877